Desmond & the Swamp Barbarian Trap is a Swedish stop motion-animated feature film that premiered on 19 November 2006.

Plot 
The pig Desmond and his friends are haunted by the terrible monster Träskpatraske. Granted, they are not sure he even exists, but who else could have snatched evil Wille's electric guitar, Sebastian Hare's boxing gloves and Bittan Cow's stock of makeup?

Cast 
 Sten Ljunggren as Berättare
 Shanti Roney as Desmond Gris
 Rikard Wolff as Helmut Sebaot Älg
 Ola Rapace as Elaka Wille Räv
 Måns Natanaelsson as Sebastian Hare
 Anna Blomberg as Bitta Ko och Fru Krokodil
 Einar Edsta Carlsson as Lille Fant Krokodil
 Rolf Skoglund as Herr Alligator
 Lotta Bromé as Märta Elefant

Production 
Animations were made by the Swedish animationstudio Dockhus (Dockhus Animation AB).

External links 
Official site (hosted by the Internet Archive)

Article about the film

Swedish animated films
2006 films
2000s stop-motion animated films
2000s Swedish films